Nemadus brachyderus is a species of small carrion beetle in the family Leiodidae. It is found in North America.

References

 Majka C, Langor D (2008). "The Leiodidae (Coleoptera) of Atlantic Canada: new records, faunal composition, and zoogeography". ZooKeys 2: 357–402.
 Peck, Stewart B., and Joyce Cook (2007). "Systematics, distributions, and bionomics of the Neoeocatops gen. nov. and Nemadus of North America (Coleoptera: Leiodidae: Cholevinae: Anemadini)". The Canadian Entomologist, vol. 139, no. 1, 87–117.
 Salgado, J. M. (1999). "The Leiodidae (Coleoptera) of the Carnegie Museum of Natural History. New data and description of two new species". The Pan-Pacific Entomologist, vol. 75, no. 1, 35–47.

Further reading

 Arnett, R.H. Jr., M. C. Thomas, P. E. Skelley and J. H. Frank. (eds.). (2002). American Beetles, Volume II: Polyphaga: Scarabaeoidea through Curculionoidea. CRC Press LLC, Boca Raton, FL.
 
 Richard E. White. (1983). Peterson Field Guides: Beetles. Houghton Mifflin Company.

Nemadus
Beetles described in 1863